Several ships have been named  :

 JDS Sugi (PF-285), a Kusu-class patrol frigate of the Japan Maritime Self-Defense Force, formerly USS Coronado (PF-38)

Imperial Japanese Navy ship names
Japanese Navy ship names